The Sparta Township Public School District is a comprehensive community public school district that serves students in pre-kindergarten through twelfth grade from Sparta Township, in Sussex County, New Jersey, United States. 

As of the 2018–19 school year, the district, comprising five schools, had an enrollment of 3,203 students and 275.9 classroom teachers (on an FTE basis), for a student–teacher ratio of 11.6:1.

The district is classified by the New Jersey Department of Education as being in District Factor Group "I", the second highest of eight groupings. District Factor Groups organize districts statewide to allow comparison by common socioeconomic characteristics of the local districts. From lowest socioeconomic status to highest, the categories are A, B, CD, DE, FG, GH, I and J.

Schools
Schools in the district (with 2018–19 enrollment data from the National Center for Education Statistics) are: 

Elementary schools
Alpine Elementary School with 695 students in grades PreK-2. Alpine School is located at 151 Andover Road. The principal of Alpine School is Peter Miller.
Mohawk Avenue School with 207 students in grade 3. The school is located at 18 Mohawk Avenue.  The principal of Mohawk Avenue is Laura Trent. 
Helen Morgan School with 439 students in grades 4-5. It is located at 100 Stanhope Road.  The principal is Douglas E. Layman.
Middle school
Sparta Middle School with 759 students in grades 6-8. The Principal is Frank Ciaburri.
High school
Sparta High School with 1,074 students in grades 9-12. The school is located at 70 West Mountain Road. The principal of Sparta High School is Dr. Edward Lazzara.

Administration
Core members of the district's administration are:
Dr. Matthew Beck., Superintendent
Joanne Black, Business Administrator / Board Secretary

Board of education
The district's board of education, with nine members, sets policy and oversees the fiscal and educational operation of the district through its administration. As a Type II school district, the board's trustees are elected directly by voters to serve three-year terms of office on a staggered basis, with three seats up for election each year held (since 2012) as part of the November general election. The Board of Education Offices are located in the Mohawk Avenue School Building.

References

External links
Sparta Township Public School District

Data for the Sparta Township Public School District, National Center for Education Statistics

New Jersey District Factor Group I
School districts in Sussex County, New Jersey
Sparta, New Jersey